Atwood is a city in and the county seat of Rawlins County, Kansas, United States.  As of the 2020 census, the population of the city was 1,290.

History
In 1875, T.A. Andrews and J.M. Matheny traveled to Rawlins County and started a town site about two miles east of the current city.  The city of Attwood (with two t's) was named after Attwood Matheny, the 14-year-old son who accompanied his father on the journey.  In 1882, the U.S. Post Office requested permission to drop one "t" thus becoming Atwood.  In 1881, Atwood became the county seat of Rawlins County.

Geography
Atwood is located at  (39.808971, −101.041370).

Climate
According to the Köppen Climate Classification system, Atwood has a semi-arid climate, abbreviated "BSk" on climate maps.

Area attractions
 Rawlins County Historical Museum, 308 State Street.
 Shirley Opera House (NRHP), 503 Main Street.

Area events
 Rawlins County Fair, held in July.

Demographics

2010 census
As of the census of 2010, there were 1,194 people, 568 households, and 299 families residing in the city. The racial makeup of the city was 97.2% White, 0.2% African American, 0.3% Native American, 0.1% Asian, 1.0% from other races, and 1.3% from two or more races. Hispanic or Latino of any race were 2.9% of the population.

There were 568 households, of which 20.2% had children under the age of 18 living with them, 43.0% were married couples living together, 6.2% had a female householder with no husband present, 3.5% had a male householder with no wife present, and 47.4% were non-families. 44.7% of all households were made up of individuals, and 23.2% had someone living alone who was 65 years of age or older. The average household size was 2.03 and the average family size was 2.84.

The median age in the city was 50.9 years. 20.3% of residents were under the age of 18; 4.7% were between the ages of 18 and 24; 17% were from 25 to 44; 29.5% were from 45 to 64; and 28.6% were 65 years of age or older. The gender makeup of the city was 47.4% male and 52.6% female.

2000 census
As of the census of 2000, there were 1,279 people, 577 households, and 347 families residing in the city. The racial makeup of the city was 98.67% White, 0.16% African American, 0.23% Native American, and 0.94% from two or more races. Hispanic or Latino of any race were 0.39% of the population.

There were 577 households, out of which 23.4% had children under the age of 18 living with them, 52.0% were married couples living together, 6.6% had a female householder with no husband present, and 39.7% were non-families. 36.9% of all households were made up of individuals, and 20.3% had someone living alone who was 65 years of age or older. The average household size was 2.12 and the average family size was 2.78.

In the city, the population was spread out, with 21.7% under the age of 18, 3.5% from 18 to 24, 21.7% from 25 to 44, 23.5% from 45 to 64, and 29.6% who were 65 years of age or older. The median age was 48 years. For every 100 females, there were 89.8 males. For every 100 females age 18 and over, there were 84.2 males.

As of 2000 the median income for a household in the city was $30,221, and the median income for a family was $39,375. Males had a median income of $27,768 versus $19,063 for females. The per capita income for the city was $16,161. About 4.5% of families and 10.7% of the population were below the poverty line, including 10.8% of those under age 18 and 10.7% of those age 65 or over.

Education
The community is served by Rawlins County USD 105 public school district, formed in 2003 by the consolidation of Herndon USD 317 and Atwood USD 318.
The district has two schools in Atwood:
 Rawlins County Junior/Senior High School
 Rawlins County Elementary School

Infrastructure

Transportation

Highway
US-36 and K-25 highways cross in Atwood.

Rail
Nebraska Kansas Colorado Railway passes through Atwood.

Airport
 Atwood-Rawlins County City-County Airport

Notable people
 Mike Hayden, 41st Governor of Kansas 1987–1990.
 Ted Uhlaender, Major League Baseball outfielder for the Minnesota Twins, Cleveland Indians and Cincinnati Reds from –.

See also
 National Register of Historic Places listings in Kansas

References

Further reading

External links

 City of Atwood
 Atwood – Directory of Public Officials
 Atwood city map, KDOT

Cities in Kansas
County seats in Kansas
Cities in Rawlins County, Kansas
Populated places established in 1875
1875 establishments in Kansas